Gilbert Talbot, 7th Earl of Shrewsbury, 7th Earl of Waterford, 13th Baron Talbot, KG (20 November 1552 – 8 May 1616), styled Lord Talbot from 1582 to 1590, was a peer in the peerage of England. He also held the subsidiary titles of 16th Baron Strange of Blackmere and 12th Baron Furnivall.

Life
He was the eldest surviving son of George Talbot, 6th Earl of Shrewsbury, by the latter's first marriage to Gertrude Manners, daughter of the first Earl of Rutland. He was born on 20th November 1553.

On February 6, 1568, Gilbert was married to Mary Cavendish, daughter of his new stepmother, Bess of Hardwick; Mary had inherited much of her formidable mother's strength of character. When Bess and her husband fell out, Gilbert took the side of his wife and his mother-in-law against his own father. However, when the old earl died in 1590, Gilbert refused Bess the widow's portion that was her due, and consequently, they fell out. He appears to have been a highly quarrelsome individual, feuding with not only his stepmother but his brother and other family members, his tenants, and even Elizabeth I herself. He was overshadowed by his formidable wife: Francis Bacon remarked that she was undoubtedly "greater than he".

The children from his marriage to Mary Cavendish were: 
Lady Mary Talbot (1580–1649), who married William Herbert, 3rd Earl of Pembroke
Lady Elizabeth Talbot (1582–1651), who married Henry Grey, 8th Earl of Kent
Lady Alethea Talbot (1585–1654), who married Thomas Howard, 21st Earl of Arundel

Two sons, George and John, died in infancy.

He was elected knight of the shire (MP) for Derbyshire in 1572. In 1576 Talbot and his wife stayed at Goodrich Castle in Herefordshire and sent his father a gift of local produce, a Monmouth cap, Ross boots, and perry. On 1 May 1578 Talbot was walking in the tiltyard, the tournament ground, at Greenwich Palace, and by chance saw Queen Elizabeth at the window of the gallery overlooking the yard, in her nightgown. Later she slapped him on the forehead and told the Lord Chamberlain, Earl of Sussex about the morning's incident. Talbot saw this as a mark of favour and wrote to his father about it.

In January 1589 he wrote to William Cecil from Handsworth Manor commiserating with him over the winter weather, and sent him a blanket and some Hallamshire foodstuffs. He was summoned to the House of Lords as Baron Talbot in 1589 and became 7th Earl of Shrewsbury on his father's death in 1590.

In 1592, he was created a Knight of the Garter, but feuded with his former friend John Stanhope when John's brother got the post of Earl Marshal of England, which Gilbert had assumed would be his. Gilbert's stepbrother Charles Cavendish challenged Stanhope to a duel for his sake, which was not fought. (Stanhope was discovered to be wearing a sword-proof doublet). Elizabeth I was displeased and took Stanhope's side. After this Gilbert challenged his own brother Edward to a duel over a lease, but Edward refused to fight him. Gilbert accused his brother of planning to poison him, but lost his case against him.

Shrewsbury employed a clockmaker, Michael Neuwers to make striking clocks in 1599. He hosted a magnificent dinner in London for a French ambassador Aymar Chaste in May 1600 and afterwards a large crowd was entertained by a French acrobat performing on a rope.

He became a patron of the arts, as was his daughter Alethea, who became Countess of Arundel by her marriage to Thomas Howard in 1606. Shrewsbury was also interested in sport, and wrote in September 1607 that he was laid up on a couch at Sheffield Lodge, "neither fit for football nor tennis".

As well as bringing up their three daughters, Gilbert and Mary Talbot spent a good deal of time with their orphaned niece, Arbella Stuart. The downfall of Arbella, who as the closest relative of King James I of England had greatly offended him by marrying without his consent, had serious consequences for Gilbert and Mary: Mary, who had aided the marriage, went to the Tower of London as a result, and Gilbert lost his seat on the Privy Council.

In the absence of a male heir, he was succeeded in the earldom of Shrewsbury by his younger brother, Edward.  However, some of the extensive estates passed then (or after Edward's death) to his daughters.

Notes

External links

|-

|-

|-

|-

|-

|-

1552 births
1616 deaths
Knights of the Garter
English MPs 1572–1583
Lord-Lieutenants of Derbyshire
Gilbert
17th-century English nobility
16th-century English nobility
Earls of Shrewsbury
Earls of Waterford
Barons Talbot
Barons Strange of Blackmere